Manapakkam is a suburb of Chennai in the Indian state of Tamil Nadu. A census town, Manapakkam is located along the Mount-Poonamallee Road in Chennai. It is now a home to many IT companies 
like DLF Cybercity Chennai and Larsen & Toubro. Manappakam has beautiful and scenic Adyar River Bank Trail suitable for morning walkers and joggers, it is a 3-km stretch extended till Chennai Airport's secondary Runway Bridge.

Geographic location
Manapakkam is located between Ramapuram and Mugalivakkam in the north, Nandambakkam (part) and Parangimalai in the east, Nandambakkam (part) and Meenambakkam in the south and Kolapakkam in the west.

Demographics
 India census, Manapakkam had a population of 8590. Males constitute 52% of the population and females 48%. Manapakkam has an average literacy rate of 73%, higher than the national average of 59.5%: male literacy is 77%, and female literacy is 69%. In Manapakkam, 11% of the population is under 6 years of age.

Transport 
Manapakkam is 5.3 kilometres from Guindy and 5.2 km from Porur. Bus services operated by MTC connect Kundrathur, Porur, and Saidapet.

The nearest railway station is Guindy railway station.

Educational institutions

CBSE affiliated schools 
 Lalaji Memorial Omega International school
 St. Francis International School
 Velammal Bodhi Campus

References 

Cities and towns in Kanchipuram district
Neighbourhoods in Chennai
Suburbs of Chennai